Dil Awaiz was a 2013 Pakistani drama serial, directed by Farooq Mengal, written by Zafar Mairaj and produced by Sikandar Baig. It stars Nauman Ejaz, Sana Nawaz, Tauqeer Nasir, Azra Aftab, Saba Faisal and Fariha Jabeen in lead roles.

Cast
 Nauman Ejaz, 
 Sana Fakhar, 
 Tauqeer Nasir,
 Azra Aftab, 
 Saba Faisal, 
 Fareeha Jabeen, 
 Jahanzeb Gourchani, 
 Taqi Ahmed,
 Sadia Ghafoor,
 Saboor Ali.

Original soundtrack

Title song of serial was composed by Chakko Lehri, while lyrics penned down by Ayyub khawar and sung by Shabnam Majeed.

Lux Style Awards 
 Best TV Play (Terrestrial)-Nominated 
 Best TV Actor (Terrestrial)-Noman Ijaz-Nominated
 Best TV Actress (Terrestrial)-Sana Fakhar-Nominated

References

External links

Pakistan Television Corporation original programming
Pakistani drama television series
Urdu-language television shows
2012 Pakistani television series debuts
2013 Pakistani television series endings